Ivan Ivanovich Shishkin (25 January 1832 – 20 March 1898) was a Russian landscape painter closely associated with the Peredvizhniki movement.

Biography

Shishkin was born to a Russian merchant family in Yelabuga of Vyatka Governorate (today Republic of Tatarstan) and graduated from the Kazan gymnasium.  Then he studied at the Moscow School of Painting, Sculpture and Architecture for four years. After that, he attended the Saint Petersburg Imperial Academy of Arts from 1856 to 1860 and graduated with the highest honours and a gold medal. He received the imperial scholarship for his further studies in Europe.

Five years later Shishkin became a member of the Imperial Academy in St Petersburg and was professor of painting from 1873 to 1898. At the same time, Shishkin headed the landscape painting class at the Highest Art School in St Petersburg.

For some time Shishkin lived and worked in Switzerland and Germany on scholarship from the St Petersburg Imperial Academy of Arts. On his return to Saint Petersburg he became a member of the Circle of the Itinerants and of the Society of Russian Etchers. He also took part in exhibitions at the Academy of Arts, the All-Russian Exhibition in Moscow (1882), the Nizhniy Novgorod (1896) and the World Fairs (Paris, 1867 and 1878, and Vienna, 1873). Shishkin's painting method was based on analytical studies of nature. He became famous for his forest landscapes and was also an outstanding draftsman and a printmaker.

Ivan Shishkin owned a dacha in Vyra, south of St Petersburg. There he painted some of his finest landscapes. His works are notable for poetic depiction of seasons in the woods, wild nature, animals and birds. In 1891 he was appointed professor-director of the landscape class in the Academy's Advanced Art School. In 1898 he completed his painting The Pine Grove and died on 20 March in St Petersburg while working on his new painting.

A minor planet 3558 Shishkin, discovered by Soviet astronomer Lyudmila Zhuravlyova in 1978, is named after him.

Gallery

References

Literary sources

External links

Ivan Shishkin at Tanais Gallery
Ivan Shishkin. Morning in a Pine Forest. Description of the picture.
Ivan Shishkin. Mast-Tree Grove. Description of the picture.
Ivan Shishkin. Rye. Description of the picture.
Works
Ivan Shishkin Memorial House Museum, Russia

1832 births
1898 deaths
People from Yelabuga
19th-century painters from the Russian Empire
Russian male painters
Painters from Saint Petersburg
Imperial Academy of Arts alumni
Russian landscape painters
Peredvizhniki
Members of the Imperial Academy of Arts
Burials at Tikhvin Cemetery
19th-century male artists from the Russian Empire
Moscow School of Painting, Sculpture and Architecture alumni